Donnie Chun-Yu Lai is a Taiwanese film director.

Life and career 
Born in 1978, Chun-yu is a Taiwanese film director and a visual effects artist who holds a master's degree from the School of Film and New Media at Taipei National University of the Arts. He has directed short films and received awards at the Taipei Film Festival.

In 2007, he won the Best Visual Effects Award at the Golden Horse Awards for his film Secret. His first feature film, Campus Confidential, released in 2013, hit NT$10 million at the box office.

Filmography

Awards

References 

1978 births
Taiwanese film directors
Living people
Taiwanese television directors